Scott Totten (born in Orange County, California) is an American musician, best known for his work as musical director, singer and guitarist in the current Beach Boys touring band, which features original Beach Boy Mike Love and later addition Bruce Johnston.
Totten attended Berklee College of Music, eventually earning a Bachelor of Music degree.  Later he was a Broadway and session guitarist. In the 1990s Totten played on albums and sessions by Grandmaster Flash, Angela Bofill, Sybill, Donna Summer and Exposé.  He also played on Broadway shows and tours such as The Who's Tommy, Les Misérables, Rent and Mamma Mia!.

Totten began playing with the Beach Boys touring band on guitar in 2000.  He moved to the position of musical director in 2008. In 2011, Totten was confirmed as performing alongside The Beach Boys on their 50th Anniversary Reunion Tour as music director and singer, also playing guitar, ukulele and bass. Totten played on the band's subsequent studio album, That's Why God Made the Radio (2012).  He also played lead guitar on "Goin' to the Beach" from the Made in California box set, and added vocals to the new single version of "Isn't it Time" from the same album. He also performed on Mike Love's solo albums Unleash the Love (2017) and Reason for the Season (2018).

References 

Year of birth missing (living people)
Living people
The Beach Boys backing band members